Tamie Michelle Sheffield (born July 27, 1970) is an American film actress, model and former professional wrestler.

Career
Sheffield was born in Mechanicsburg, Pennsylvania and graduated from Mechanicsburg Senior High School in 1988. She graduated  from West Chester University with a degree in Elementary Education. She was also a cheerleader from junior high through college. Sheffield gave campus tours and was in the Phi Sigma Sigma sorority.

Sheffield became a professional wrestler in the California-based Women of Wrestling (WOW) promotion. Using the name Sandy, Sheffield was given the gimmick of a Baywatch-like lifeguard along with a tag team partner named Summer. The duo was collectively known as The Beach Patrol.

Sheffield started her acting career in 1999 in the movie Wildflower and appeared in Slammed, Cheerleader Massacre, The Deviants and Black Tie Nights. She also hosted two Lingerie Bowls. In 2003, Sheffield was a contestant on the third season of NBC's Fear Factor, becoming the winner of her episode. She returned later in the season for the semi-final, where she was unsuccessful.

References

External links

 Official Site
 

1974 births
American female professional wrestlers
American film actresses
American female models
Actresses from Pennsylvania
Living people
Reality show winners
West Chester University alumni
21st-century American women